Esporte Clube Corinthians de Bataguassu, commonly known as Corinthians, was a Brazilian football team based in Bataguassu, Mato Grosso do Sul state.

History
The club was founded on June 14, 1991. Corinthians reached the semifinals in the 2000 Campeonato Sul-Mato-Grossense, when they were eliminated by Ubiratan. They folded in 2001.

Stadium
Esporte Clube Corinthians de Bataguassu played their home games at Estádio Municipal de Bataguassu. The stadium has a maximum capacity of 5,000 people.

References

Association football clubs established in 1991
Association football clubs disestablished in 2001
Defunct football clubs in Mato Grosso do Sul
1991 establishments in Brazil
2001 disestablishments in Brazil